Prima J is the self-titled debut and only album from American duo Prima J. It was released on June 17, 2008. It features 13 tracks, including the singles "Rockstar", "Nadie (No One)" and "Corazón (You're Not Alone)".

The album spent one week on the Billboard 200 album chart at number 172 in July 2008, but peaked at number six on the Billboard Top Heatseekers Albums chart, spending nine weeks on the chart.

Track listing

Singles
"Rockstar" – Originally released on the soundtrack of Bratz: The Movie. It spent 1 week on the Billboard Pop 100 chart, peaking at No. 93
"Nadie (No One)" – peaked at No.1 On Billboard's Dance Singles Chart.
"Corazón (You're Not Alone)" – Spent 1 week on the Billboard Pop 100 and peaked at No. 99.

Production credits 
  Happy Perez – track 1
 Jim Jonsin – track 3
 Beau Dozier – track 4, 12
 John Frazier Jr. – track 5
 J. R. Rotem – track 8
 Oak Felder – track 9
 Troy NōKa – track 7
 Madd Scientist – track 6, 11
 Shama "Sak Pase" Joseph – track 13

Credits 
Aaron Ahl- Engineer
Giuliano Bekor- Photography
Anthony Burrise- Illustrations
Anthony Caruso- Assistant Engineer
Antwoine "Troy NōKa" Collins - Producer
Daniel Crawford- Keyboards
Beau Dozier- Producer, Vocal Producer
Mike "Angry" Eleopoulos- Engineer, Vocal Tracking
Ron Fair- Conductor, Keyboards, Producer, Executive Producer, String Arrangements, Vocal Producer, String Conductor
Joe Francis- Gonzales Engineer
Erica Grayson- A&R
Bernie Grundman- Mastering
Jorge Hernández- Personal Manager
Tal Herzberg- Digital Editing
Mike Hogue- Assistant Engineer
Bruce Johnson- Personal Manager
Jim Jonsin- Producer
Ryan Kennedy- Engineer
Drea LaVelle- Engineer
Rico Love- Vocals
Peter Mokran- Mixing
The Movement- Producer
Oak- Producer
Greg Ogan- Engineer
Dave Pensado- Mixing
Happy Perez- Producer
Stefanie Ridel- Executive Producer, Vocal Producer
Chad Rober- Engineer
J.R. Rotem- Producer, Vocal Producer
Lasette Smith- Spanish Translation, Vocal Producer
Allen Smith- Spanish Translation, Vocal Producer
Terry "Mad Scientist" Thomas- Producer, Engineer, Vocal Producer
Eric Weaver- Mixing Assistant
Elvis "Black Elvis" Williams- Producer
Andrew Wuepper- Mixing Assistant

Charts

References 

2008 debut albums
Prima J albums
Geffen Records albums
Albums produced by Happy Perez
Albums produced by Jim Jonsin
Albums produced by Oak Felder